Juventude Ouriense is a Rink Hockey team from Ourém, Portugal.

2006/07 squad

External links
juventudeouriense.com

Rink hockey clubs in Portugal
Sport in Ourém